Avatus Harry Stone (April 21, 1931 – November 2, 2000) was an American gridiron football player. After playing his college football at Syracuse University, Stone was drafted by the Chicago Cardinals in the 1953 NFL Draft, but played professionally in Canada with the Ottawa Rough Riders from 1953 to 1956. His best year was playing tailback in 1955 when he won the Jeff Russel Memorial Trophy as best player in the East. He played seven games for the Montreal Alouettes in 1957, and finished his career in 1958 with the Baltimore Colts of the NFL, playing one game, and punting once for 28 yards.

Stone died of cancer on November 2, 2000.

References

2000 deaths
1931 births
American football halfbacks
American football quarterbacks
American players of Canadian football
Canadian football running backs
Baltimore Colts players
Montreal Alouettes players
Ottawa Rough Riders players
Syracuse Orange football players
Players of American football from Washington, D.C. 
Deaths from cancer in Virginia